Así en el cielo como en la tierra (In heaven as it is on earth, referencing the Our Father) is a 1995 Spanish comedy film directed by José Luis Cuerda.

Plot
Matacanes arrives at Heaven but it is not exactly as he imagined it, as it resembles a typical Spanish village with God as the mayor and Saint Peter as a civil guard (although Saint Peter explains that this is Spanish Heaven and other countries' heavens are different) Some people, however, are nervous because God, unhappy with things on Earth, is planning to have another child. Jesus becomes jealous and tries to convince his father to accelerate the Apocalypse instead.

Cast

Critical reception
Fernando Morales in El País wrote that the movie just barely get a pass, despite the good casting. Carlos Aguilar in his Guía del cine español praises the premise and the actor's performances but concludes that the film "lacks shape and rhythm".

External links

References

1995 films
1990s Spanish-language films
Films about the afterlife
Religious comedy films
1995 comedy films
Spanish comedy films
1990s Spanish films
Films directed by José Luis Cuerda